The Companions of the Rass, also known as the People of the Well or the People of Ar-Rass, were an ancient community, who are mentioned in the Qur'an. The Qur'an provides little information concerning them other than to list them with other communities, including ʿĀd, Thamud, the People of Noah and others; the Qur'an groups all these communities together as nations who went astray and were perished for their sins. Muslim scholars related that the Companions of the Rass were a community in the Azerbaijan region. The root meaning of rass is a well or water pit, but some scholars have stated that Rass was the name of a river or the city itself. It is speculated that modern Aras River is ar-Rass.

Another less common theory is that Companions of the Rass were an Indus Valley civilisation. With Rass meaning "well" or "along the water channels" or "water tranches". Means refer to place which has lot of wells. Today we know that at Mohenjo-daro around 700 wells existed at the peak of their civilization. Similar estimates Harappa city itself 300 well. Same about Dholavira, where many trenches were created to store water. Some Arabs referred to Indus people as Companions of the Rass.

Account in Exegesis
Other documents of Islamic literature give little information on the place or people of this particular community. However, Ibn Kathir states in his Stories of the Prophets that the prophet sent to them was a man named Hanzalah ibn Sifwan. Exegesis narrates that the people of this community threw the prophet into a well, with some accounts narrating that he died in the well and others narrating that he survived.

References

Ancient peoples
Semitic-speaking peoples
Rass